Plac Konstytucji is a proposed and planned Warsaw Metro station. It was included in the original plans, however it was temporarily dropped in 1989 due to budget constraints. As of 2009 this station is in hiatus - it is listed as a planned investment, but the last official update regarding its status dates to 2006. However, in September 2019 the Warsaw city council announced plans to build the station after all. A contractor has been announced, and will have until 2026 to build the station. The proposed location of the station is the corner of Marszałkowska and Hoża streets, some 300 m north of the Constitution Square.

References

Proposed Warsaw Metro stations